The 2016 Australian motorcycle Grand Prix was the sixteenth round of the 2016 Grand Prix motorcycle racing season. It was held at the Phillip Island Grand Prix Circuit in Phillip Island on 23 October 2016.

This race marked 2006 MotoGP world champion Nicky Hayden's final start in Grand Prix motorcycle racing before succumbing to his injuries after a cycling accident on 22 May 2017. Hayden was replacing Dani Pedrosa for this race.

Classification

MotoGP

Moto2

 Álex Márquez withdrew from the race after injuries to his wrist and back suffered in a crash during warm-up.
 Isaac Viñales suffered a shoulder injury in a crash during qualifying.

Moto3
The race, scheduled to be run for 23 laps, was red-flagged after 5 laps due to accident and was later restarted for 10 laps.

Championship standings after the race (MotoGP)
Below are the standings for the top five riders and constructors after round sixteen has concluded.

Riders' Championship standings

Constructors' Championship standings

 Note: Only the top five positions are included for both sets of standings.

References

Australian
Motorcycle Grand Prix
Australian motorcycle Grand Prix
Australian motorcycle Grand Prix
Motorsport at Phillip Island